Bhakra Management Board Karamchari Sangh (BMBKS) is a trade union in Punjab, India, affiliated to the Bharatiya Mazdoor Sangh, organizing workers of the Bhakra Beas Management Board.

BMBKS was the recognized trade union at BMBB until 2001, when recognition was transferred to the rival Nangal Bakra Mazdoor Sangh.

Trade unions in India
Bharatiya Mazdoor Sangh-affiliated unions
Trade unions in Bhakra Beas Management Board